Manuel González Pató (3 March 1913 – 10 November 1973) was a Puerto Rican educator, writer, and sportsman.

Early years
González Pató was born in barrio Maragüez, Ponce, Puerto Rico, on 3 March 1913.  He was the third of four children. He attended schools in Ponce and graduated from Ponce High School.

Schooling and career
In 1931 he studied agricultural education at the University of Louisiana.  While there, he boxed on the college varsity team as a welter weight. In 1937 he worked teaching vocational agriculture in Puerto Rico until 1939. In 1939, he served in the United States Army during World War II, where he reached the rank of second lieutenant.

In 1949 he became physical education teacher at the Ponce High School, where he rose to general supervisor for physical education curriculum within the Puerto Rico Department of Education.  In 1953 he entered the teaching staff at the Pontifical Catholic University of Puerto Rico, where he stayed until his death. At the PCUPR he taught track and field athletics, and he coached physical education students into world champions.

He attended the Olympic Games in Los Angeles in 1952 and the Pan American Games in 1954, 1958, and 1959. He was a trainer and chief of athletics at the Central American Games in San Juan in 1966, and a delegate from Puerto Rico to the British community Games in Kingston, Jamaica.

Writings
González Pató wrote several books. His "Tratado de la Educación Física y los Deportes Atléticos" was used by the O.E.A.

Family life
González Pató married Fellita Argüelles, with whom he had two children: María del Pilar y Manuel Rafael.

Death
González Pató died in Ponce on 10 November 1973.

Legacy
 There is a bust of González Pató at the Student Center of the Universidad Catolica de Puerto Rico. 
 The 1975 "Olimpiada Jíbara de la Vivienda" was dedicated to him (1975).  
 In Ponce, there is an intermediate school ("middle school") named after him.  
 He is recognized at Ponce's Parque de los Ponceños Ilustres in the area of sports.
 The athletic track at the Villa del Carmen residential community in Barrio Playa is named after him.
 In Ponce, he is recognized at the Park for the Illustrious Ponce Citizens.

See also

 List of Puerto Ricans

References

Further reading
 Tratado de la Educación Física y los Deportes Atléticos. Ponce: Universidad Católica, 1966.
 "Dedican a memoria González Pató II Olimpiada Jíbara," El Mundo, 2 January 1975, p. 40.
 "Monumento al profesor González Pató," El Vocero de Puerto Rico, 23 September 1980, p. 4.
 "Rinden homenaje a González Pató," El Mundo, 19 September 1980, p. 3.

1913 births
1973 deaths
Educators from Ponce
Puerto Rican Army personnel
Military personnel from Ponce
Puerto Rican military officers
United States Army officers